Martinapis is a genus of long-horned bees in the family Apidae. There are at least three described species in Martinapis.

Species
These three species belong to the genus Martinapis:
 Martinapis bipunctata (Friese, 1908)
 Martinapis luteicornis (Cockerell, 1896) (yellow-horned morning long-horned bee)
 Martinapis occidentalis Zavortink & LaBerge, 1976 (western morning long-horned bee)

References

Further reading

External links

 

Apinae
Articles created by Qbugbot